The Northern Irish Derby was a short-lived 36-dog greyhound racing competition held in Northern Ireland. 
The event was held at Drumbo Park over 550 yards and carried a £25,000 prize, which was the richest ever held in Northern Ireland. The event was short-lived, however, and finished after the 2014 running.

Past winners 

Discontinued

References

Venues
2011-2014 Drumbo Park

Sponsors
2011-2012 Bettor.com
2011-2014 Toals Bookmakers

External links
Irish Greyhound Board

Greyhound racing competitions in Ireland